Charles Richard McEleny (3 March 1874 – 1 August 1908) was an Irish professional footballer who mostly played as a centre half.

Football career
Born in Raymoghy, County Donegal, McEleny moved to Scotland where he first played for Greenock Volunteers before joining Abercorn. He signed for Celtic in November 1893 and played his first match on 4 November in a 3–1 league victory against Dundee at Parkhead. McEleny was a strong and powerful centre half and established himself as a first team regular. Charlie was the first ever Irish born player to play for Glasgow Celtic.

In November 1895 he signed for English side Burnley where he made 15 Football League appearances, before returning to Celtic in May 1896. Playing only a year he moved south again to play for New Brighton Tower. In his two spells at Celtic, McEleny played 41 games and scored once.

In May 1899, McEleny signed for Aston Villa where he played as a half back in his solitary first team appearance before leaving Villa in May 1900.

He then joined Swindon Town of the Southern League where he made a total of 48 appearances, scoring twice. He then had a spell at Brentford before returning to Scotland with Morton.

Later career and death
On quitting football he worked as a painter/decorator.

McEleny died on 1 August 1908 aged 34 at Smithston, Greenock.

References

1873 births
1908 deaths
Irish association footballers (before 1923)
Association football central defenders
Celtic F.C. players
Burnley F.C. players
New Brighton Tower F.C. players
Aston Villa F.C. players
Swindon Town F.C. players
Brentford F.C. players
Greenock Morton F.C. players
English Football League players
Scottish Football League players
Association footballers from County Donegal
Southern Football League players
Abercorn F.C. players
Intimations 1901-1909 https://www.inverclyde.gov.uk/assets/attach/5121/Intimations-1901-1909.pdf